John O'Farrell may refer to:

John O'Farrell (author) (born 1962), British author, broadcaster and politician
John O'Farrell (politician) (1826–1892), Canadian politician
John O'Farrell (venture capitalist), Irish American venture capitalist
John A. O'Farrell (1823–1900), Irish American adventurer, miner

See also
J. T. O'Farrell (died 1971), Irish politician and trade union official 
John Farrell (disambiguation)